Hastings is an unincorporated community and agricultural center in St. Johns County, Florida, United States,  southwest of St. Augustine.  It was formerly an incorporated town, but it was dissolved in 2018 after a vote by residents.  The population was 580 at the 2010 census. As of 2018, the population estimated by the U.S. Census Bureau to be 648.

History
Henry Morrison Flagler built tourist hotels at St. Augustine in the late 19th century, including the Ponce de León Hotel. He needed a local source of fresh vegetables for his guests, so he persuaded Thomas Horace Hastings, his cousin, to develop a farm. A small community evolved into a town, which was named for its founder in 1890.

Hastings in 1910 was thriving town that was a stop on the Florida East Coast Railway.  The population of approximately 1,200 supported several general stores, a bakery, drug stores, meat markets, an ice plant and cold storage.  
In addition to farming, two companies manufactured barrels and a grist mill ground grain. 
There was a bank and a hotel, three doctors and a dentist. The town had water and sewer utilities, telephone and telegraph service. The local public school was good. Today the former FEC line is part of the Palatka-to-St. Augustine State Trail, and a trailhead can be found in the community within the Cora C. Harrison Preserve.

On November 7, 2017, the voters of Hastings elected to dissolve the city with an 82% majority vote. St. Johns County officially took control of the area on March 1, 2018.

The United States Census Bureau designated Hastings as a census-designated place in the 2020 census.

National exposure
The town was briefly in the spotlight when the American Broadcasting Company television network show, Extreme Makeover: Home Edition featured the Harvey family in a show aired on April 24, 2005, with assistance from its local affiliate WJXX. The project was completed in seven days of work. Much of the actual labor was performed by the non-profit Builder's Care, a unit of the NFBA. Builder's Care also performed an "Extreme Community Outreach" in the surrounding homes to identify and resolve problems in plumbing, electrical, air conditioning and structure.

Geography
Hastings is located at  (29.7180, -81.5081).

Climate

Demographics

As of the census of 2000, there were 521 people, 213 households, and 139 families residing in the town. The racial makeup of the town was 52.02% White, 43.38% African American, 0.58% Pacific Islander, 2.11% from other races, and 1.92% from two or more races. Hispanic or Latino of any race were 4.99% of the population.

There were 213 households, out of which 27.7% had children under the age of 18 living with them, 46.9% were married couples living together, 15.5% had a female householder with no husband present, and 34.3% were non-families. 29.6% of all households were made up of individuals, and 13.1% had someone living alone who was 65 years of age or older.  The average household size was 2.44 and the average family size was 3.00.

In the town, the population was spread out, with 26.1% under the age of 18, 7.3% from 18 to 24, 27.3% from 25 to 44, 21.7% from 45 to 64, and 17.7% who were 65 years of age or older.  The median age was 38 years. For every 100 females, there were 84.8 males.  For every 100 females age 18 and over, there were 79.9 males.

The median income for a household in the town was $26,635, and the median income for a family was $30,769. Males had a median income of $25,909 versus $20,694 for females. The per capita income for the town was $14,537.  About 15.4% of families and 21.0% of the population were below the poverty line, including 27.0% of those under age 18 and 16.3% of those age 65 or over.

Education

It is in the St. Johns County School District.

Zoned schools include South Woods Elementary School, Gamble Rogers Middle School, and Pedro Menendez High School.

The Hastings High School was built in 1924 to provide education for the children of the farmers in the southwest corner of the county. In 1985 it closed, and the Hastings Branch of the St. Johns County Public Library is located in this building. Hastings Elementary School was replaced by Hastings Elementary-Junior High School, which occupied the former high school facility, in 1985. In 1992 it dropped its junior high school program. The school, now Hastings Elementary School, was in operation until its 2005 closure. South Woods Elementary opened in the fall of that year, replacing Hastings Elementary.

The only public school in the town post-2005 was the Hastings Youth Academy, an Alternative school.

St. Johns County Public Library has a library in the former school.

Notable people
 Derrick Ramsey (born 1956), Kentucky Secretary of Education and Workforce Development and former NFL player who played tight end for nine seasons for the Oakland/Los Angeles Raiders, New England Patriots and Detroit Lions.
Ron Waller, American football player.

References

External links

 Hastings former town website

Towns in St. Johns County, Florida
Towns in the Jacksonville metropolitan area
Populated places established in 1890
2018 disestablishments in Florida
Former municipalities in Florida
Towns in Florida
Populated places on the St. Johns River
Populated places disestablished in 2018